Mademoiselle Zazie (also known as Miss Zazie) is a CGI-animated television series produced by Cyber Group Studios and Scrawl Studios. It debuted on France 5's Zouzous block on August 24, 2013.

The series is about 7-year-old best friends Zazie and Max, who live by the seaside with the others and have fun together.

Characters

Main
 Zazie She has red hair in twintails
 Cindy She has blonde hair, blue eyes and wears glasses
 Abigail
 Max He is tall and thin with black hair
 Pedro He is short and chubby with brown hair
 Tarek
 Alfredo
 Clodomir

Episodes

Broadcast
Mademoiselle Zazie debuted on France 5's Zouzous block on August 24, 2013. It also aired on France 4 and TV5Monde in France, and TFO and Yoopa in Canada. In the United States, the English dub of Mademoiselle Zazie premiered on Kabillion's Kabillion Girls Rule! on March 15, 2015. By December 2021, this series was also aired by TVRI in Indonesia.

References

External links

 
 Mademoiselle Zazie on TFO
 Mademoiselle Zazie on Yoopa
 Mademoiselle Zazie on Zouzous

2013 French television series debuts
2010s French animated television series
French children's animated adventure television series
French children's animated comedy television series
French computer-animated television series
French-language television shows
Animated television series about children